Nobody Is Perfect is a 2006 Spanish comedy film directed by Joaquín Oristrell and written by Albert Espinosa. The story follows a peculiar friendship among cripples. It is a Diagonal Televisió, Mediapro, and Pentagrama Films production.

Cast

See also 
 List of Spanish films of 2006

References

External links

2006 comedy films
2006 films
2000s Spanish-language films
Spanish comedy films
2000s Spanish films